Cho Hee-jae (born 22 October 1965) is a South Korean fencer. He competed in the team épée event at the 1988 Summer Olympics. He now coaches the Korea men's épée team.

References

External links
 

1965 births
Living people
South Korean male épée fencers
Olympic fencers of South Korea
Fencers at the 1988 Summer Olympics
Asian Games medalists in fencing
Fencers at the 1990 Asian Games
South Korean épée fencers
Asian Games gold medalists for South Korea
Medalists at the 1990 Asian Games